The 1979–80 Kentucky Wildcats men's basketball team represented the University of Kentucky during the 1979–80 college basketball season.

Schedule

|-
!colspan=6 style=| Regular season

|-
!colspan=6 style=| SEC Tournament

|-
!colspan=6 style=| NCAA Tournament

References

Kentucky
Kentucky
Kentucky Wildcats men's basketball seasons
Kentucky Wildcats
Kentucky Wildcats